The group stage featured 32 teams: the 22 automatic qualifiers and the 10 winners of the play-off round (five through the Champions Path, five through the Non-Champions Path).

The teams were drawn into eight groups of four, and played each other home-and-away in a round-robin format. The matchdays were 14–15 September, 28–29 September, 19–20 October, 2–3 November, 23–24 November, and 7–8 December 2010.

The top two teams in each group advanced to the first knockout round, while the third-placed teams dropped down to the Europa League Round of 32.

Partizan and Žilina became only the 11th and 12th teams in UEFA Champions League history to lose all six group stage matches.

Seeding
The draw for the group stage was held in Monaco on 26 August 2010 at 6:00 p.m. CEST (UTC+2).

Teams were seeded into four pots based on their 2010 UEFA club coefficients. The title holders, Internazionale, were automatically seeded into Pot 1. Teams from the same national association could not be drawn against each other. Pot 1 held teams ranked 1–10, Pot 2 held teams ranked 11–29, Pot 3 held teams ranked 30–63, while Pot 4 held teams ranked 73–180 and unranked teams.

TH Title holder

c Qualified through Play-off round (Champions Path)

n Qualified through Play-off round (Non-Champions Path)

On each matchday, four groups played their matches on Tuesday, while the other four groups played their matches on Wednesday, with the two sets of groups (A–D, E–H) alternating between each matchday. Based on this principle, the draw was controlled for clubs from the same association in order to split the teams evenly into the two sets of groups.

The fixtures were decided after the draw. There are certain restrictions, e.g., teams from the same city (e.g. Milan and Internazionale, which also share a stadium) do not play at home on the same matchday (UEFA tries to avoid teams from the same city play at home on the same day or on consecutive days), and Russian teams do not play at home on the last matchday due to cold weather.

Tie-breaking criteria
If two or more teams were equal on points on completion of the group matches, the following criteria would be applied to determine the rankings:
higher number of points obtained in the group matches played among the teams in question;
superior goal difference from the group matches played among the teams in question;
higher number of goals scored away from home in the group matches played among the teams in question;
superior goal difference from all group matches played;
higher number of goals scored;
higher number of coefficient points accumulated by the club in question, as well as its association, over the previous five seasons.

Groups
Times are CET/CEST, as listed by UEFA (local times are in parentheses).

Group A

Group B

Group C

Group D

Group E

Group F

Group G

Group H

Notes

References

External links
2010–11 UEFA Champions League, UEFA.com

Group Stage
UEFA Champions League group stages